Tawana Petty is an American author, poet, social justice organizer, mother and youth advocate who works to counter systemic racism. She currently is the Director of Policy and Advocacy for the Algorithmic Justice League. 

From December 2020 to January 2022, she was the National Organizing Director for Data for Black Lives. She is an alumni practitioner fellow at the Stanford Center on Philanthropy and Civil Society (PACS), member of the Detroit Digital Justice Coalition, and founder of Petty Propolis.

In light of police brutality against black individuals, Petty and other researchers like Deborah Raji and Ruha Benjamin are working towards putting an end to the use of surveillance technologies like facial recognition in policing. The failure of these technologies to correctly identify darker-skinned individuals raises the concern that these algorithms are biased against Black individuals.

Notable work 
Petty has been involved in numerous efforts to center racial equity in data science.

Alongside the Detroit Community Technology Project, Petty has been outspoken against Detroit's "Project Green Light," an attempt to use video footage gathered by private businesses to surveil Detroit residents using facial recognition. She was a member of the curatorial team for DEPTH, an exhibition at Science Gallery Detroit.

As one of the contributors to Our Data Bodies, Petty has focused on working with community organizations across the US to push back against data collection efforts that harm minoritized people. The project "combines community-based organizing, capacity-building, and rigorous academic research." The group has published several interim reports. First, "From Paranoia to Power" in 2016, and then "Reclaiming our data" in 2018.

Petty uses her poetry as a mode of resistance. She uses the name Honeycomb in conjunction with this work, and her first book of poetry was entitled Introducing... Honeycomb. Her second book of poetry, Coming Out My Box, focuses on her lived experience as a Black woman from Detroit. She has a one-woman show by the same name. In addition to her personal poetry work, Petty believes in helping young people find their poetic voice. One workshop she teaches is entitled “Poetry As Visionary Resistance." The organization she leads for this work is called Petty Propolis, which also offers anti-racism training, organizes a yearly arts festival, and has led to the book Petty Propolis Reader.

Towards Humanity: Shifting the Culture of Anti-racism Organizing

Awards 
 2011 Spirit of Detroit Award
 2011 Women Creating Caring Communities Award
 2012 The Woman of Substance Award
 2015 Detroit Awesome Award
 2016 University of Michigan Black Law Student Association's Justice Honoree Award
In 2021, named one of 100 Brilliant Women in AI Ethics
2023 CAIDP Civil Society AI Policy Leader Award

References

External links 
 Tawana Petty's profile from the Stanford Center on Philanthropy and Civil Society
 Tawana Petty's LinkedIn

Activists from Detroit
American anti-racism activists
African-American activists
Living people
Year of birth missing (living people)
21st-century American women